Norodom Monineath Sihanouk (born Paule Monique Izzi; 18 June 1936) is the queen mother of Cambodia. She was queen consort of Cambodia from 1993 to 2004, as the wife of King Norodom Sihanouk. She is the widow of King-Father Norodom Sihanouk, whom she married in 1955 as the "secondary consort" (Sihanouk married his official wife, Norodom Thavet Norleak, as the "first lady" also in 1955, before being married to Monineath). After Sihanouk and Norleak divorced in 1968, Monineath became the official spouse of the King.

Monineath and King Sihanouk had two children: Norodom Sihamoni and Norodom Narindrapong; both were born before their parents married. Her official, full title is "Samdech Preah Mahaksatrey Norodom Monineath Sihanouk". The Queen is also called "Preah Voreakreach Meada Cheat Khmer" (lit. "mother of the Khmer nation"). Her birthday on 18 June is an official public holiday in Cambodia.

Biography

Early life
Norodom Monineath was born on 18 June 1936, in Saigon, French Indochina, in present-day Vietnam. She was born Paule-Monique Izzi, and is sometimes referred to as Queen Monique.
Her father, Jean-François Izzi, was a French banker of Corsican, French and Italian descent, who was Director of Crédit Foncier in Saigon, and killed in World War II. Her mother, Pomme Peang, was from Phnom Penh.

Norodom Monineath studied at the Primary School Norodom, Sisowath High School, and the Lycée René Descartes. She met Norodom Sihanouk in 1951, when he awarded her first prize in a beauty pageant. They lived together since 12 April 1952, and married  on 5 March 1955 at Khemerin Palace, as the "secondary consort" (Sihanouk married his official wife, Norodom Thavet Norleak, on 4 March 1955, before being married to Monineath). She has been described as the close confidant of Sihanouk.

1955-1970
In 1955, Princess Monique's husband abdicated in favor of his father, but continued to rule the country as premier. In 1960, he became head of state again, but known as premier and with the title prince. Princess Monique served as president of the Cambodian Red Cross (CRC) in 1967–1970.

Princess Monique, as she was called during this period, was exposed to some criticism from the Khmer Republic for her life during the reign of Sihanouk in the 1960s. The propaganda of the Khmer Republic was later to accuse her of having caused the strained relationship between Sihanouk and his mother, the popular queen mother Sisowath Kossamak, and for being the cause to why her spouse prevented his mother from succeeding to the throne in 1960.

The Khmer Republic propaganda claimed that she had advised Sihanouk to introduce the unpopular state casino, which was at the time viewed as a symbol of national decadence, and alleged that she, her mother Madame Pomme, and her brother Oum Manorine contributed to corruption by promoting proteges to lucrative offices. The Khmer Republic reportedly once burned her image in effigy for corruption.

Khmer Rouge

After the Cambodian coup of 1970, she joined her husband in exile first in Beijing in China and then North Korea. As guests of the North Korean leader Kim Il-sung, a palace with 60 rooms was given them as their residence during their stay. In 1973, Norodom Sihanouk allied himself with the Khmer Rouge against their common enemy, Lon Nol. The royal couple also made a visit to Khmer Rouge territory in Cambodia before returning to China.

After the fall of Phnom Penh to the Khmer Rouge in April 1975, she returned to the royal palace in Phnom Penh in Cambodia with her husband, who was appointed nominal head of state by the Khmer Rouge. From 1976 onward, however, they were both kept under house arrest by the Khmer Rouge. They were reportedly subjected to a political re-education program during these years, and at least 18 members of the extended royal house were killed. Reportedly, the regime suggested to have them executed, but this was prevented by intervention by China and North Korea.

In January 1979, Pol Pot allowed for her and her husband to be evacuated from Cambodia by the Chinese. The original plan was to evacuate only Sihanouk and Monineath, but Pol Pot himself insisted that all members of the royal house should be given a place on the Chinese plane.

Later life 
Norodom Monineath spent the following years with her husband as state guests of China and North Korea. She is credited to have played some part in the peace negotiations arranged between Sihanouk and Hun Sen by Tong Siv Eng in 1987 and 1988, and she is known to have been present during the negotiations.

In 1991, she returned to Cambodia with Sihanouk. On 22 February 1992, she was elevated by the King to the rank of Samdech Preah Cheayea. On 24 September 1993, she was raised to the rank of Samdech Preah Mohèsey Norodom Monineath of Cambodia. On 2 January 1996, the King elevated her to the rank of Samdech Preah Reach Akka Mohèsey Norodom Monineath.

Sihanouk reportedly suggested to change the constitution to make it possible for her to be a regent and succeed him on the throne, but ultimately, this did not come about, and he chose to abdicate in favor of their son instead.

Monineath speaks Khmer, French, and English. She is currently the Cambodian Red Cross Honorary President.

In 2010 she was nominated for Time Person of the Year by Documentation Center of Cambodia Director Youk Chhang who praised the Queen Mother as an "embodiment of resilience, dignity and courage."

Children
The King Father and the Queen Mother have two sons, all born before they got married:

 Norodom Sihamoni (born 14 May 1953); was given the title of Samdech Krom Khun by HM the King in 1994 and was Ambassador of Cambodia to UNESCO in Paris. He is the current King of Cambodia.
 Norodom Narindrapong (18 September 1954 – 7 October 2003) has two daughters.

Patronages 
 President of Honour of the Cambodian Red Cross Society (President from 1967 until 1970). 
 Co-President of the Funcinpec Party (from 1989 until 1992).

Honours

National 
 Knight Grand Cross of the Royal Order of Cambodia.

Foreign 
 
 Member with Collar of the Order of Friendship (6 November 2020)

 Ethiopia
 Dame Grand Cordon of the Order of the Queen of Sheba (7 May 1968)

 Honorary Recipient of the Order of the Crown of the Realm (1996)
 Honorary Grand Commander of the Order of the Defender of the Realm (1963)

 Grand Cross of the National Order of Mali (1973)

References

External links
King

1936 births
Cambodian queens
Cambodian people of Corsican descent
Living people
People from Ho Chi Minh City
Cambodian people of French descent
Cambodian Theravada Buddhists
House of Norodom
Grand Crosses of the National Order of Mali
Knights Grand Cross of the Royal Order of Cambodia
Cambodian people of Italian descent
Red Cross personnel
Queen mothers
Spouses of prime ministers of Cambodia
Princesses by marriage
Recipients of orders, decorations, and medals of Ethiopia